Senba Tōshō-gū (仙波東照宮) is a Shinto shrine in Kawagoe, Saitama Prefecture, Japan. It enshrines the first Shōgun of the Tokugawa Shogunate, Tokugawa Ieyasu. It is enumerated as one of the Three Great Tōshō-gū Shrines (日本三大東照宮). The shrine was founded in 1617.

See also 
Tōshō-gū
List of Tōshō-gū

External links 

 

Shinto shrines in Saitama Prefecture
Tōshō-gū